Mucurubá is a community in Mérida state, Venezuela, in the foothills of the Cordillera Oriental. It is 2,407 m above sea level, about 32 kilometers from the city of Mérida. It is a parish within the Rangel Municipality. The name is derived from the words "muco" (place) and "ruba" (a tuber similar to potato) in the language spoken by the  pre-Columbian inhabitants. The settlement was found in 1586 by Bartolomé Gil Naranjo.

The climate is cool and dry, with an average temperature of 16.5 °C, suitable for irrigated farming of crops such as potato, carrot, lettuce, garlic, blackberries, strawberries, peaches and figs. In colonial times, corn was an important crop, ground in water mills.

References

Populated places in Mérida (state)

https://sites.google.com/view/mucuruba